The 1974 Indian Open was a men's tennis tournament played on outdoor clay courts in Bombay, India. It was the second edition of the event and was held from 11 November through 17 November 1974. The tournament was part of the Grand Prix tennis circuit and categorized in Group B. Third-seeded Onny Parun won the singles title.

Finals

Singles
 Onny Parun defeated  Tony Roche 6–3, 6–3, 7–6

Doubles
 Anand Amritraj /  Vijay Amritraj defeated  Dick Crealy /  Onny Parun 6–4, 7–6

References

External links
 International Tennis Federation (ITF) tournament edition details

Indian Open
Open